Allard Plummer Miller was a Costa Rican footballer who played as a striker. He was the father of Honduran former footballer Carlos Pavón.

Club career
In Costa Rica, Plummer played for Limón and Cartaginés. He was Limonense's club top goalscorer in 1972 and 1976.

He moved abroad to play for Honduran side Marathón of San Pedro Sula, making his debut on 10 September 1972 against Real España, and scored 19 goals in 76 matches with team. Plummer was top scorer of Honduran Liga Nacional in 1973–74 season with 13 goals, along with Mario Artica.

References

Living people
People from Limón Province
Association football forwards
Costa Rican footballers
C.S. Cartaginés players
C.D. Marathón players
Liga Nacional de Fútbol Profesional de Honduras players
Costa Rican expatriate footballers
Expatriate footballers in Honduras
1949 births